FK Vigør is a Norwegian football club from Hellemyr, Kristiansand. Vigør is the Norwegian name for vigor. The club colors are brown and white, and the club was founded on 5 October 1918.

The men's team currently resides in the Third Division, the fourth tier of Norwegian football, having last played in the Second Division in 2000. It contested a playoff to win promotion to the First Division in 1996, but failed.

FK Vigør also has a women's section. It fielded a senior team in the league system in 2008, but not in 2009.

Former players
Many former Vigør players have gone on to play professionally in the Norwegian Premier League or elsewhere.

Goalkeepers
Espen Johnsen
Rune Nilssen
Kenneth Udjus

Defenders
Marius Johnsen
Lars Martin Engedal
Steffen Hagen
Knut Henry Haraldsen
Sven Fredrik Stray
Yngvar Håkonsen
Vetle Andersen
Tore Løvland
Per Christian Osmundsen

Midfielders
Leif Otto Paulsen
Christer Kleiven
Kristofer Hæstad
Sven Otto Birkeland

Strikers
Tore André Dahlum
Andreas Lund
Thom Jarle Thomassen
Kjetil Bøe
Espen Daland
Bjørn Vidar Gundersen

References

External links
Official site

Football clubs in Norway
Association football clubs established in 1918
Sport in Kristiansand
1918 establishments in Norway